William Penn Bates (June 7, 1879 – March 2, 1956) was an American football player and coach of football, basketball, and baseball. He played college football as a fullback at Brown University for four years, including as team captain in 1901.  Bates served as the head football coach at Auburn University in 1903 and at Franklin & Marshall College from 1904 to 1905, compiling a career coaching record of 8–19.  Bates was also the head basketball coach at Franklin & Marshall from 1903 to 1905, tallying a mark of 11–9, and the head baseball coach at the school from 1905 to 1906, notching a record of 6–14–1.

Coaching career
After graduating from Brown in 1902, Bates was the head football coach for the 1903 Auburn Tigers football team. His team compiled a record of 4–3.

The following year, he became the head football coach at Franklin & Marshall College located in Lancaster, Pennsylvania.  He held that position for the 1904 and 1905 seasons.  His coaching record at Franklin & Marshall was 4–16.

Head coaching record

References

External links
 

1879 births
1956 deaths
19th-century players of American football
Basketball coaches from Rhode Island
American football fullbacks
Auburn Tigers football coaches
Brown Bears football players
Franklin & Marshall Diplomats baseball coaches
Franklin & Marshall Diplomats football coaches
Franklin & Marshall Diplomats men's basketball coaches
Sportspeople from Providence, Rhode Island
Coaches of American football from Rhode Island
Players of American football from Providence, Rhode Island